Marina Pendeš (born 20 August 1964) is a Bosnian Croat politician who is the current member of the House of Peoples. She served as Minister of Defence from 2015 to 2019. Pendeš is a member of the Croatian Democratic Union.

Early life and education
Pendeš was born in Travnik on 20 August 1964. She attended elementary school in Vitez and high school in Travnik. She graduated in electrical engineering from the Military Technical Academy in Zagreb in 1988 after receiving a scholarship from the Yugoslav National Army.

Career
Pendeš was an independent constructor in the military industry in Travnik from 1988 until 1992, and head of the department of TKC SB in Vitez from 1995 until 2003. She was a member of the Croatian Defence Council and worked in the Military Intelligence Service in Central Bosnia during the Bosnian War.

Pendeš is a member of the Croatian Democratic Union (HDZ) and was first elected to parliament in 2000. She was Minister of Physical Planning, Restructuring and Return for the Central Bosnia Canton from 2003 to 2004. She was the Deputy Minister of Defence from 2004 to 2015 before being appointed Minister of Defence on 31 March 2015. Her term as Minister ended on 23 December 2019. 

Pendeš later became a member of the national House of Peoples.

Charges
In July 2015, Pendeš was charged by the State Prosecutor's Office for paying a salary to her advisor Ivo Miro Jović while she was Deputy Minister, despite him not showing up to work. In February 2016, she was acquitted by the Court of Bosnia and Herzegovina of the charges of careless performance of official duties and forging documents.

References

External links

Minister of Defence profile

Living people
1964 births
People from Travnik 
Croats of Bosnia and Herzegovina
Bosnia and Herzegovina women in politics
21st-century women politicians
Croatian Democratic Union of Bosnia and Herzegovina politicians
Female defence ministers
Government ministers of Bosnia and Herzegovina
Defence ministers of Bosnia and Herzegovina
Croatian Defence Council